The 1930–31 season was Real Madrid Club de Fútbol's 29th season in existence, and their 3rd consecutive season in the Primera División. The club also played in the Campeonato Regional Centro (Central Regional Championship) and the Copa del Rey.

The establishment of the Second Spanish Republic in April 1931 caused Real Madrid Club de Fútbol to lose the title "Real" and the royal crown from their crest and badge, and Real Madrid went back to being named Madrid Football Club.

First-team squad

Transfers

In

Out

Friendlies

Competitions

Overview

La Liga

League table

Matches

Campeonato Regional Centro

League table

Matches

Copa del Rey

Notes

External links
Real Madrid History 

1930-1931
Spanish football clubs 1930–31 season